Crystallographer could refer to someone who practices:

X-ray crystallography
Crystallography